Wild America is a documentary television series that focuses on the wild animals and wild lands of North America. By the mid-1970s, Marty Stouffer had put together several full-length documentaries that were licensed as prime time network television specials.  At that time, he approached the programming managers at Public Broadcasting Service (PBS) about a half-hour-long wildlife series, the first to focus exclusively upon the flora and fauna of North America. PBS signed for the rights to broadcast Marty Stouffer's series Wild America in 1981. The series went on to become one of the most popular aired by PBS, renowned for its unflinching portrayal of nature, as well as its extensive use of film techniques such as slow motion and close-ups. Stouffer earned as much as $250,000 per show from PBS.

The show's production ran from 1982 to 1994. The series is no longer on PBS; reruns still air in syndication on commercial television through much of the United States. In 1997, Warner Bros. released a full-length feature film of the same name, which was based on the biographical story of Marty Stouffer and his brothers, Mark and Marshall. The show is now distributed by Storrs Media and Telco Productions for Syndication.

Episodes 

The "Wild America" series contained a total of 120 half-hour episodes.

Special episodes

See also
 Wild America (film)
 Wild Kingdom

References

External links
 
 

Television series by CBS Studios
English-language television shows
1982 American television series debuts
1994 American television series endings
1980s American documentary television series
1990s American documentary television series
Documentary films about nature
Television series about mammals
Television series about birds
Television series about reptiles and amphibians
PBS original programming